The Roman Catholic Archdiocese of Trujillo is an archdiocese located in the city of Trujillo in Peru.

According to a Zenit online news article, with no author listed and dated Tuesday, July 10, 2012, Archbishop Miguel Cabrejos Vidarte, O.F.M., the current Metropolitan Archbishop, has been asked by the President of Peru, President Ollanta Humala, and the Peruvian Minister of Justice, Juan Jiménez, to mediate a mining conflict in the northern Region of Cajamarca, Peru.

History
 April 15, 1577: Established as Diocese of Trujillo from the Metropolitan Archdiocese of Lima
 May 23, 1943: Promoted as Metropolitan Archdiocese of Trujillo

Ordinaries

Diocese of Trujillo
Erected: 15 April 1577
Alonso Guzmán y Talavera, O.S.H. (15 Apr 1577 Appointed – ) 
Francisco de Ovanda, O.F.M. (15 Apr 1577 Appointed – ) 
Jeronimo de Carcamo (25 May 1611 – 1614 Died) 
Francisco Diaz de Cabrera y Córdoba, O.P. (6 Oct 1614 – 26 Apr 1620 Died)
Carlos Marcelo Corni Velazquez (17 Aug 1620 – 16 Oct 1630 Died) 
Ambrosio Vallejo Mejía, O. Carm. (10 Feb 1631 – 29 Oct 1635 Died) 
Diego Montoya Mendoza (5 Oct 1637 – 14 Apr 1640 Died) 
Luis Córdoba Ronquillo, O.SS.T. (13 Aug 1640 – 24 Nov 1640 Died) 
Pedro de Ortega y Sotomayor (21 Aug 1645 – 26 Dec 1647 Appointed, Bishop of Arequipa)
Andrés García de Zurita (4 Apr 1650 – 2 Aug 1652 Died) 
Diego del Castillo y Arteaga (9 Mar 1654 – 25 Feb 1658 Confirmed, Bishop of Badajoz) 
Francisco de Godoy (1 Sep 1659 – Dec 1659 Died) 
Juan de la Calle y Heredia, O. de M. (5 Sep 1661 – 1 Oct 1674 Appointed, Bishop of Arequipa)
Alvarus de Ibarra (17 Dec 1674 Confirmed – ) 
Antonio de León y Becerra (19 Oct 1676 – 14 Jun 1677 Appointed, Bishop of Arequipa)
Francisco de Borja (bishop) (4 Sep 1679 – 13 Apr 1689 Died) 
Pedro de La Serena, O.S.H. (28 Sep 1693 – Sep 1695 Died) 
Pedro Díaz de Cienfuegos (20 Feb 1696 – 9 Jan 1702 Died) 
Juan Víctores de Velasco, O.S.B. (28 Nov 1707 – 10 Dec 1713 Died) 
Diego Montero del Aguila (21 Jan 1715 – 25 Feb 1718 Died) 
Jaime de Mimbela, O.P. (20 Mar 1720 – 4 Aug 1739 Died) 
Gregorio de Molleda y Clerque (19 Dec 1740 – 4 Sep 1747 Confirmed, Archbishop of La Plata o Charcas)
José Cayetano Paravicino, O.F.M. (4 Sep 1747 – 20 Oct 1750 Died) 
Bernardo de Arbizu y Ugarte (15 Nov 1751 – 20 Oct 1756 Died) 
Cayetano Marcellano y Agramont (23 May 1757 – 13 Mar 1758 Appointed, Archbishop of La Plata o Charcas) 
Francisco Javier de Luna Victoria y Castro (13 Mar 1758 – 11 Mar 1777 Died) 
Baltasar Jaime Martínez Compañón (1 Jun 1778 – 15 Dec 1788 Appointed, Archbishop of Santafé en Nueva Granada) 
José Andrés de Achurra y Núñez del Arco (15 Dec 1788 – 1793 Died) 
Blas Manuel Sobrino y Minayo (12 Sep 1794 – 26 Apr 1796 Died) 
José Carrión y Marfil (3 Jul 1798 – 24 Jan 1825 Retired) 
Tomás Diéguez y Florencia (24 Jul 1835 – 8 Jun 1845 Died) 
José Higinio Madalengoitia y Sanz de Zárate (19 Jan 1846 – 4 Nov 1848 Died) 
Agustín Guillermo Charún Espinoza (7 Mar 1853 – 22 Feb 1857 Died) 
Francisco de Asis Orueta y Castrillón, C.O. (26 Sep 1859 – 21 Mar 1873 Appointed, Archbishop of Lima) 
José Domingo Armestar Espinoza de los Monteros (21 Dec 1874 – 14 Dec 1881 Died) 
Manuel Santiago Medina y Bañon (14 Feb 1889 – 22 Mar 1907 Died) 
Carlos Garcia Irigoyen (21 Mar 1910 – 21 Oct 1937 Died) 
Juan Gualberto Guevara y de la Cuba (15 Dec 1940 – 16 Dec 1945 Appointed, Archbishop of Lima)

Archdiocese of Trujillo
Elevated: 23 May 1943  
Juan Gualberto Guevara y de la Cuba (15 December 1940 – 16 December 1945 Appointed, Archbishop of Lima)
Aurelio Macedonio Guerrero (20 September 1946 – 25 May 1957 Retired) 
Federico Pérez Silva, C.M. (15 June 1957 – 16 October 1965 Died) 
Carlos Maria Jurgens Byrne, C.SS.R. (6 December 1965 – 29 December 1976 Resigned) 
Manuel Prado Perez-Rosas, S.J. (29 December 1976 – 29 July 1999 Retired) 
Héctor Miguel Cabrejos Vidarte, O.F.M. (29 July 1999 Appointed – )

Other affiliated bishops

Auxiliary bishops
José Higinio Madalengoitia y Sanz de Zárate (1840-1846), appointed Bishop here
Alfonso Zaplana Bellizza (1952-1957), appointed Bishop of Tacna
Luis Baldo Riva, C.SS.R. (1969-1977), appointed Prelate of Chuquibamba
Tarcisio Pusma Ibáñez (2008), did not take effect
José Javier Travieso Martín, C.M.F. (2009-2014), appointed Vicar Apostolic of San José del Amazonas 
Timoteo Solórzano Rojas, M.S.C. (2018-)
Francisco Castro Lalupú (2020-)

Other priest of this diocese who became bishop
Francisco de Paola Grozo, appointed Bishop of Cajamarca in 1910

Suffragan dioceses
 Diocese of Cajamarca
 Diocese of Chimbote
 Territorial Prelature of Huamachuco
 Diocese of Huaraz
 Diocese of Huarí
 Territorial Prelature of Moyobamba

See also
Roman Catholicism in Peru

References

Sources
 GCatholic.org
 Catholic Hierarchy

Roman Catholic dioceses in Peru
Roman Catholic Ecclesiastical Province of Trujillo
1577 establishments in the Spanish Empire
Religious organizations established in the 1570s
Roman Catholic dioceses established in the 16th century